Meisam Aghababaei is an Iranian footballer who most recently plays for Naft Tehran in the IPL.

Club career
Aghababaei has played with Naft Tehran since 2009.

Club Career Statistics

References

Living people
Naft Tehran F.C. players
Iranian footballers
Association football defenders
Year of birth missing (living people)